Sebastian Zoltán Achim (born 2 June 1986) is a Romanian footballer who plays as a defender for Füzesgyarmati SK. A product of FC Bihor Oradea youth academy, club for which he also made his debut at senior level, Achim played in Liga I for Gloria Bistriţa, Universitatea Cluj, Petrolul Ploiești and Universitatea Craiova.

Honours
Petrolul Ploieşti 
Cupa României: 2012–13

References

External links
 
 
 

1986 births
Living people
Sportspeople from Oradea
Romanian footballers
Romanian expatriate footballers
Association football defenders
Liga I players
Liga II players
FC Bihor Oradea players
ACF Gloria Bistrița players
FC Universitatea Cluj players
FC Petrolul Ploiești players
CS Universitatea Craiova players
Nemzeti Bajnokság I players
Nemzeti Bajnokság II players
Gyirmót FC Győr players
Szeged-Csanád Grosics Akadémia footballers
Romanian expatriate sportspeople in Hungary
Expatriate footballers in Hungary
Nemzeti Bajnokság III players